Esmond Julian Curnow (born 27 October 1946) is an Australian politician.

He was born in Bendigo to factory manager Thomas William Curnow and Esma Jean Cook. He attended Bendigo High School and became the manager of a bedding store. He joined the Labor Party in 1962 and was a member of the Castlemaine and Moonee Ponds branches. In 1970 he was elected to the Victorian Legislative Assembly for Kara Kara, serving until his seat was abolished in 1976. After leaving politics he became a publican, and also the secretary of the Bendigo Trades Hall Council from 1981 to 1983. From 1983 to 1985 he was a training officer with the Trade Union Training Authority, and from 1985 he was a National Union of Workers official. He married Jennifer Diane Freeman on 23 January 1976; they were divorced in 1984.

References

1946 births
Living people
Australian Labor Party members of the Parliament of Victoria
Members of the Victorian Legislative Assembly